Mary Elizabeth Hughes (November 13, 1919 – August 27, 1995) was an American film, television, and stage actress best known for her roles in B movies.

Early life and career
Hughes was born  in Alton, Illinois. Her parents, George Joseph Hughes and Mary Frances Hughes, separated when she was an infant and divorced in 1923. After the divorce, Hughes's mother moved with her only child to Washington, D.C. Hughes' grandmother, Flora Fosdick, was described as a "star of grand opera and drama [who] played with Ethel Barrymore on the stage."

As a child Hughes began acting in stage productions. While acting in a school play in the early 1930s, her performance caught the attention of Clifford Brown, a repertory theatre company owner, who offered her a part in a touring production of Alice in Wonderland. While touring with another production in Brown's company, she was offered a contract from a talent scout with Gaumont-British Studios but declined the offer to finish high school.

After graduating from high school in 1937 she returned to Brown's theatre company, where she continued to appear in various stage productions until the summer of 1938, when she relocated to Los Angeles with her mother to pursue a film career. After six months of failing to land movie roles, Hughes and her mother made plans to return to Washington, D.C., until Hughes met an agent, Wally Ross. Ross introduced Hughes to powerful William Morris agent Johnny Hyde. Hyde landed Hughes a contract with MGM, and she soon landed a small, uncredited role in the 1939 film Broadway Serenade.

Film career

After Broadway Serenade, Hughes appeared in other bit parts in films including The Women with Norma Shearer, Dancing Co-Ed with Lana Turner, and the Busby Berkeley film Fast and Furious.

In 1940 Hughes was offered a contract with 20th Century-Fox. Later that year she landed a role opposite John Barrymore in The Great Profile, a part she later noted as one of her favorites. Fox did not renew her contract when it expired in 1943, and the following year she  began appearing in a nightclub act and soon signed a three-picture deal with Universal Pictures.

Her most famous role was as Henry Fonda's former girlfriend in the Best Picture Academy Award nominee, The Ox-Bow Incident (1943). Throughout the mid-1940s and early 1950s, Hughes appeared in film and television roles, including the cult classic I Accuse My Parents (which was later parodied on Mystery Science Theater 3000), Anthony Mann's early noir masterpiece The Great Flamarion where she co-starred with Erich von Stroheim and Dan Duryea, Wanted: Dead or Alive (episode "Secret Ballot"), The Devil's Henchman, The Abbott and Costello Show, Dragnet and Studio One.

Later years
In 1961, Hughes decided to retire from acting and began working as a receptionist in a plastic surgeon's office, although she continued her appearances in nightclubs. The following year she directed and starred in a Los Angeles production of Pajama Top. For the rest of the 1960s she would go on to appear in television shows like Rawhide and Dennis the Menace. In 1970 she landed a regular role on The Red Skelton Show, appearing in 11 episodes before the show ended later that year. In 1976 she again retired from show business, explaining that she was "tired of auditioning for sexy grandma roles." Hughes' last onscreen appearance was in the 1976 film Tanya.

In the late 1970s Hughes opened a beauty parlor in Canoga Park, California. She closed the shop in the late 1980s and began working as a telemarketer until 1991, when she was laid off.

Personal life
As a starlet under contract with MGM, Hughes went on studio-appointed dates with several actors, including Lew Ayres, Franchot Tone, Mickey Rooney, and James Stewart. While under contract to Fox, she also went on arranged dates with Milton Berle and George Montgomery.

In 1940, against Fox's wishes, Hughes began a relationship with actor Robert Stack. The romance lasted a year.

After her romance with Stack ended, Hughes married actor Ted North in 1943. The couple had one son, Donald, before divorcing in 1947. On April 28, 1948, she married singer/actor David Street. The marriage ended in divorce on January 23, 1956. In 1973 Hughes married her manager, Nicky Stewart, but that marriage also ended in divorce four years later.

Death
Hughes died, aged 75, on August 27, 1995 from natural causes in Los Angeles. Upon her death, she was cremated and her ashes returned to her surviving son.

Filmography

 Within the Law (1939) as Mamie (voice, uncredited)
 Broadway Serenade (1939) as Girl at Party (uncredited)
 The Kid from Texas (1939) as Polo Match Spectator (uncredited)
 Bridal Suite (1939) as Bride (uncredited)
 These Glamour Girls (1939) as Ann
 The Women (1939) as Miss Trimmerback
 Dancing Co-Ed (1939) as 'Toddy'
 Fast and Furious (1939) as Jerry Lawrence
 The Covered Trailer (1939) as Betty Higgins
 Free, Blonde and 21 (1940) as Jerry Daily
 Star Dust (1940) as June Lawrence
 Four Sons (1940) as Anna
 Lucky Cisco Kid (1940) as Lola
 The Great Profile (1940) as Sylvia
 Sleepers West (1941) as Helen Carlson
 Ride on Vaquero (1941) as Sally Slocum
 The Great American Broadcast (1941) as Secretary
 The Cowboy and the Blonde (1941) as Crystal Wayne
 Dressed to Kill (1941) as Joanne La Marr
 Charlie Chan in Rio (1941) as Joan Reynolds
 Design for Scandal (1941) as Adele Blair
 Blue, White and Perfect (1942) as Merle Garland
 The Night Before the Divorce (1942) as Lola May
 Orchestra Wives (1942) as Caroline Steele
 The Ox-Bow Incident (1942) as Rose Mapen
 Over My Dead Body (1942) as Patricia Cordry aka Pat Preston
 Good Morning, Judge (1943) as Mira Bryon
 Follow the Band (1943) as Dolly O'Brien
 Melody Parade (1943) as Anne O'Rourke
 Never a Dull Moment (1943) as Flo Parker
 Timber Queen (1944) as Elaine Graham
 Men on Her Mind (1944) as Lily Durrell
 Take It Big (1944) as Gaye Livingston
 I Accuse My Parents (1944) as Kitty Reed
 The Great Flamarion (1945) as Connie Wallace
 Rockin' in the Rockies (1945) as June McGuire
 The Lady Confesses (1945) as Vicki McGuire
 Caged Fury (1948) as Lola Tremaine
 Waterfront at Midnight (1948) as Ethel Novack
 The Return of Wildfire (1948) as Judy Marlowe
 Joe Palooka in Winner Take All (1948) as Millie
 Inner Sanctum (1948) as Jean Maxwell
 Last of the Wild Horses (1948) as Terry Williams
 El Paso (1949) as Stagecoach Nellie
 Rimfire (1949) as Polly
 Grand Canyon (1949) as Terry Lee
 The Devil's Henchman (1949) as Silky
 Square Dance Jubilee (1949) as Barbara Clayton
 Riders in the Sky (1949) as Julie Stewart
 Young Man with a Horn (1950) as Marge Martin
 Holiday Rhythm (1950) as Alice
 Passage West (1951) as Nellie McBride
 Close to My Heart (1951) as Arlene
 Highway Dragnet (1954) as Terry Smith
 Loophole (1954) as Vera
 Las Vegas Shakedown (1955) as Mabel Dooley
 Dig That Uranium (1955) as Jeanette
 Gun Battle at Monterey (1957) as Cleo
 The Blue Hour (1971)
 How's Your Love Life? (1971) as Linda Roberts
 The Working Girls (1974) as Mrs. Borden
 Tanya (1976) (final film role)

Television credits

 Nash Airflyte Theatre (1 episode, 1950) as Lydia
 The Adventures of Ellery Queen (1 episode, 1951)
 Not for Publication (1 episode, 1952)
 The Philco Television Playhouse (1 episode, 1953)
 Racket Squad (1 episode, 1953) as Kendall Hastings
 The Abbott and Costello Show (1 episode, 1953) as Dixie King
 My Hero (2 episodes, 1952-1953) as Lilli Martin AKA the Atomic Blonde / Myrna
 Big Town (2 episodes, 1953–1954) as Charlotte Casterline
 The Ford Television Theatre (1 episode, 1954) as Dolores Martin
 The Public Defender (1 episode, 1954) as Eve Manchester
 The Lone Wolf (1 episode, 1954) as Barbara Kincaid
 Fireside Theater (1 episode, 1954) as Waitress
 The Man Behind the Badge (1 episode, 1955) as Rose Gilbert
 The Eddie Cantor Comedy Theater (1 episode, 1955)
 Front Row Center (2 episodes, 1955) as Miriam Blake / Kitty Packard
 Dragnet (1 episode, 1956)
 The Eve Arden Show (1 episode, 1957) as Burlesque Queen
 Colt .45 (1 episode, 1957) as Clover Haig
 Playhouse 90 (1 episode, 1958) as Mrs. Leeds
 December Bride (1 episode, 1958)
 Studio One (1 episode, 1958) as Ginger Ferris
 Buckskin (1 episode, 1958) as Diana Marlowe
 Pursuit (1 episode, 1958) as Evelyn
 Frontier Doctor (1 episode, 1958) as Lillian Lloyd
 The Adventures of Rin Tin Tin (1 episode, 1959) as Lil Morris
 Wanted: Dead or Alive (1 episode, 1959) as Dolly King
 The Thin Man (2 episodes, 1958–1959) as Eve Marloff / Pat Renard
 The Deputy (1 episode, 1961) as Madge Belden
 Dennis the Menace (1 episode, 1961) as Charles' Mother
 Holiday Lodge (1 episode, 1961) as Mona
 Rawhide (2 episodes, 1959–1963) as Lola / Sarah
 The Red Skelton Show (11 episodes, 1955–1970) as Sally Albright / Ruthie / Ruby - San Fernando Red's Accomplice / Clara Appleby / McCluskey's Moll / Velma - Philip's Accomplice

References

External links

 The Official Mary Beth Hughes site
 
 
Husband Nicky Stewart on You Bet your Life with Groucho Marx

American film actresses
American television actresses
American stage actresses
People from Alton, Illinois
Actresses from Illinois
1919 births
1995 deaths
20th Century Studios contract players
20th-century American actresses
Actresses from Washington, D.C.